Thelymitra spadicea, commonly called the browntop sun orchid, is a species of orchid that is endemic to Tasmania. It has a single erect, fleshy leaf and up to four relatively small blue flowers with small darker spots and an elongated lobe on top of the anther.

Description
The lobe on the top of the anther is brown with a blue band, a yellow elongated tip and small teeth. The side lobes have dense, mop-like tufts of white hairs. Flowering occurs in November and December.

Taxonomy and naming
Thelymitra spadicea was first formally described in 1999 by David Jones from a specimen collected near Stanley and the description was published in Australian Orchid Research. The specific epithet (spadicea) is a Latin word meaning “of a light brown colour", referring to the colour of the anther lobe.

Distribution and habitat
The browntop sun orchid grows in coastal and near coastal heath in northern and western Tasmania.

References

External links
 

spadicea
Endemic orchids of Australia
Orchids of Tasmania
Plants described in 1998